Belleville Mennonite School is located in Belleville, Pennsylvania, United States. It is situated between Stone Mountain and Jack's Mountain. The valley they form is known as Big Valley. Belleville Mennonite is a member of the Association of Christian Schools International.

This private, Christian school is currently led by superintendent, Nicholas Wilson, along with high school principal, Mr. Jon Farley, middle school principal, Mrs. Jessica Geissinger, and elementary principal, Mrs. Becky Williams. The school educates around 235 students with more 25 faculty members.

Belleville Mennonite School underwent a rebranding beginning in the 20122013 school year. First, the school introduced a new mascot known as the "Belleville Thunder". Later, they made changes in their public image by introducing a new website and logo. "The new logo features an infinity symbol and Christian cross encompassed in a ring and outer circle."

History
The school was founded in 1945 by assimilated Mennonites in order to establish control over the education of their children at a time of school reorganization. At first, it was considered to be a complete Mennonite school, based on the community's religion.  The school is now more diverse and is the largest Christian school in Mifflin County.

Academic standards
The 2007 PSSA test score results showed that BMS students performed above the national average.

Notable faculty
 Joseph Yoder (22 September 1872 - 13 November 1956), educator, musicologist, and writer who taught at the school.

References

External links
 Official website
 Belleville Mennonite School (Belleville, Pennsylvania, USA) at Global Anabaptist Mennonite Encyclopedia Online

Private elementary schools in Pennsylvania
Private middle schools in Pennsylvania
Private high schools in Pennsylvania
Mennonite schools in the United States
Mennonitism in Pennsylvania
Educational institutions established in 1945
Schools in Mifflin County, Pennsylvania
1945 establishments in Pennsylvania
Christian schools in Pennsylvania